João Pedro Henriques Neto (born 11 September 1984 in Porto), known as João Pedro, is a former Portuguese footballer who played as a midfielder.

External links

1984 births
Living people
Footballers from Porto
Portuguese footballers
Association football midfielders
Primeira Liga players
Liga Portugal 2 players
Segunda Divisão players
Cypriot Second Division players
Boavista F.C. players
Ermesinde S.C. players
S.C. Beira-Mar players
C.F. União de Lamas players
Gondomar S.C. players
ASIL Lysi players
Digenis Akritas Morphou FC players
Doxa Katokopias FC players
C.D. Cinfães players
Portugal youth international footballers
Portuguese expatriate footballers
Expatriate footballers in Cyprus
Portuguese expatriate sportspeople in Cyprus